"Innocent" is a song written by Jimmy Jam and Terry Lewis and recorded by American recording artist Alexander O'Neal, whose original version was released as his first solo single in 1985 on Tabu Records. It is also a single from the singer's self-titled debut solo studio album, Alexander O'Neal (1985). The song's distinctive backing vocals were performed by Cherrelle. The song's time was edited for release as a single, with the album version being a medley consisting of "Innocent"/"Alex 9000"/"Innocent II", and was just over six minutes longer.

Release
The song was notably his only single from the album not to chart in the UK. However, the single became an immediate success in the US, reaching #11 on the Hot R&B/Hip-Hop Songs chart.

Track listing
 12" (4Z9 05140)
 "Innocent" – 10:34
 "Innocent (Instrumental)" – 9:54

 7" Single (ZS4 04718)
 "Innocent" – 4:43
 "Are You the One?" – 3:41

Sales chart performance

Peak positions

References

External links
 

1985 debut singles
Alexander O'Neal songs
Songs written by Jimmy Jam and Terry Lewis
Song recordings produced by Jimmy Jam and Terry Lewis
1985 songs
Tabu Records singles